is a Japanese politician. He currently serves as governor of Kōchi Prefecture since 2019.

References 

1963 births
Living people
Politicians from Kōchi Prefecture
University of Tokyo alumni
Governors of Kochi Prefecture